The 2008 New York Sportimes season was the ninth season of the franchise in World TeamTennis (WTT).

The Sportimes had 10 wins and 4 losses and finished second in the Eastern Conference, missing the conference championship by losing a standings tiebreaker to the New York Buzz. The Sportimes lost to the Buzz, 25–17 in overtime, in the WTT Semifinals.

Season recap

Draft
The Sportimes protected John McEnroe in the Marquee Player Draft. In the Roster Player Draft, the Sportimes had the fourth pick in each round. They protected Jesse Witten and Hana Šromová in the second and third rounds, respectively. The Sportimes left Ashley Harkleroad unprotected in the first round and instead chose Bethanie Mattek. Brian Wilson was taken in the fourth round, leaving Mirko Pehar unprotected. The team did not select any roster-exempt players. Dustin Taylor replaced Chuck Adams as the head coach.

Luzhanska signed to substitute for Mattek
With Bethanie Mattek's availability in doubt, because she and her partner Sania Mirza reached the quarterfinals of the ladies' doubles tournament at Wimbedon, the Sportimes signed Tetiana Luzhanska as a substitute player to replace her. The team announced on July 2, 2008, that, with Mattek eliminated from Wimbledon the previous day, Luzhanska would play only in the season-opening match, and Mattek would be available beginning with the second match of the season on July 7.

A brilliant start
The Sportimes started their season with a four-match homestand that pitted them against the Boston Lobsters in the opener on July 3, 2008. The Sportimes found themselves trailing, 12–9, after three sets. Jesse Witten started the comeback with a 5–3 men's singles set win over Jan-Michael Gambill. Hana Šromová and Brian Wilson took the final set of mixed doubles, 5–3, and the Sportimes squeezed out a 19–18 victory.

After three days off, the Sportimes returned to the court to host the Philadelphia Freedoms. Again, the Sportimes dug themselves a hole, trailing, 13–11, after three sets. Bethanie Mattek, making her Sportimes debut, dominated Audra Cohen, 5–0, in the women's singles set to give New York a 16–13 lead. After Mattek and Wilson dropped a tiebreaker in the fifth set of mixed doubles, they won the first game of overtime to give the Sportimes a 21–18 win.

The following evening, the Sportimes built a 15–10 lead over the New York Buzz after three sets. Wilson and Witten opened the match with a 5–3 set win in men's doubles. Mattek and Šromová followed by taking a tiebreaker in women's doubles. Mattek and Wilson won the mixed doubles set, 5–3. The Buzz answered with Yaroslava Shvedova taking the women's singles set from Mattek, 5–3, and Nathan Healey topping Witten in men's singles by the same score. With the Sportimes clinging to a 21–20 lead, Witten won the first game of overtime over Healey to secure a 22–20 triumph.

On July 10, 2008, the Sportimes welcomed Serena Williams and the expansion Washington Kastles to Harbor Island. Wilson and Witten won the opening set of men's doubles in a tiebreaker, and Williams and Mashona Washington did the same in women's doubles to tie the match at 9 all. In the third set, Williams teamed with Justin Gimelstob for a 5–2 mixed doubles set win over Mattek and Wilson that gave the Kastles a 14–11 lead. Facing Williams in women's singles, Mattek built a 3–1 lead, before the Kastles inserted Washington as a substitute. Mattek closed out the set win, 5–2, to tie the match at 16 all. In the final set of men's singles, Witten won a tiebreaker over Scott Oudsema to clinch a 21–20 victory for the Sportimes and complete their perfect homestand with a record of 4 wins and 0 losses.

The following evening, the Sportimes faced their first challenge on the road, when they visited the Delaware Smash. Witten opened the match by winning a tiebreaker in men's singles. Mattek followed with a 5–0 set win over Madison Brengle in women's singles. After the Smash won the men's doubles set in a tiebreaker, Mattek and Šromová earned a 5–3 set win in women's doubles that gave the Sportimes a 19–12 lead. A 5–2 mixed doubles set win by Liezel Huber and Chris Haggard cut the lead to 21–17, but Mattek and Wilson responded by winning the first game of overtime to secure a 22–17 win.

The Sportimes returned home on July 12, 2008, to face the Freedoms for the second time. The Freedoms won the first two sets to build a 10–5 lead. Witten won the men's singles set, 5–2, to cut the lead to 12–10. After the Freedoms won the fourth set of mixed doubles, the Sportimes found themselves trailing, 17–13. Mattek took on Lisa Raymond in women's singles and won the set, 5–1, to tie the match at 18 all and send it to a super tiebreaker. Mattek completed the comeback by taking the super tiebreaker from Raymond, 7–5. The 19–18 victory improved the Sportimes' record to 6 wins and 0 losses and left them as one of only two undefeated teams in WTT.

Mattek departs, and the Sportimes struggle
Without any formal announcement by the Sportimes or WTT, Bethanie Mattek vanished from the team after its sixth match. Mattek had played a key role in the early-season success of the Sportimes, who won all five matches in which she appeared. After the WTT season ended, Mattek was still featured prominently on the Sportimes' website home page. She was apparently not injured, since she appeared in the LA Women's Tennis Championships, which opened on July 21, before the WTT season had concluded. Mattek was replaced for the Sportimes' July 13 road match against the Boston Lobsters by Robin Stephenson, who had appeared against them earlier in the season as a member of the Philadelphia Freedoms but had been released.

The Sportimes opened a three-match road trip by falling behind the Lobsters, 10–3, after two sets. Set tiebreaker wins by Jesse Witten in men's singles and Hana Šromová in women's singles cut the deficit to 18–13. But the Lobsters won a tiebreaker in the final set of mixed doubles to put away a 23–17 victory and hand the Sportimes their first loss of the season.

On July 14, 2008, the Sportimes signed Milagros Sequera with the apparent intention of replacing Mattek for the remainder of the season. Her first match with the team came that same day on the road against the Freedoms, and John McEnroe also made his season debut in that match. The Freedoms opened the match with a 5–1 set win over McEnroe and Brian Wilson in men's doubles. Sequera teamed with Šromová to win a tiebreaker in the women's doubles set. McEnroe managed to take a men's singles tiebreaker over Alex Bogomolov Jr. that cut the Freedoms' lead to 13–11. The Sportimes pushed in front, when Sequera won the women's singles set, 5–1. Sequera then teamed with Wilson for a 5–1 set win in mixed doubles that clinched a 21–15 win for the Sportimes.

The next evening, the Sportimes built an early 10–2 lead in the finale of their road trip against the Washington Kastles. They were led by Sequera who teamed with Wilson for a 5–1 set win in the opening set of mixed doubles and followed by taking the women's singles set by the same score. However, the Kastles won the next three sets and tied the match at 17 all, when Mashona Washington and Sacha Jones took the final set of women's doubles from Sequera and Šromová, 5–1. Washington and Jones won the super tiebreaker, 7–5, to give the Kastles an 18–17 victory.

After an off day, the Sportimes returned to Harbor Island for the final two home matches on their schedule. They won the first four sets of their match against the Springfield Lasers, the first three in tiebreakers, to take a 20–14 lead. After dropping the final set of mixed doubles, Sequera and Wilson won the first game of overtime to secure a 24–19 victory.

The following evening, the Sportimes hosted the Newport Beach Breakers. After dropping the opening set of men's doubles in a tiebreaker, the Sportimes took a 9–5 lead, when Sequera and Šromová dominated Michaela Paštiková and Rebecca Bernhard in women's doubles, 5–0. Sequera later teamed with Wilson for a 5–3 set win in the fourth set of mixed doubles and closed out a 22–14 win by taking the final set of women's singles, 5–1. The victory gave the Sportimes a perfect record of 7 wins and 0 losses at home and improved their overall record to 9 wins and 2 losses with three road matches to play to close the regular season.

On July 22, 2008, the Sportimes opened their three-match road trip to close the season against the second-place New York Buzz. The Sportimes' magic number for clinching the Eastern Conference championship stood at 2. A victory in this match would not only clinch the conference title but also no worse than the number 2 seed in the WTT playoffs. While the Sportimes enjoyed a day off the previous day, they clinched a playoff berth and a bye to the WTT semifinals when the Kansas City Explorers defeated the Kastles, 24–13. On this day, however, the Sportimes struggled. They dropped the first two sets and fell behind, 10–3. Witten won the third set of men's singles to cut the deficit to 13–8. But the Buzz cruised to easy set wins in the fourth and fifth sets on their way to a 23–11 victory. The dominant win assured the Buzz of the standings tiebreaker edge against the Sportimes, since the teams had split their two regular season matches, but the Buzz had a 43–33 advantage in games won in those matches.

After a win over the Breakers, the Sportimes' magic number for winning the Eastern Conference title was reduced to 1. Playing on the West Coast in the Pacific Time Zone against the defending champion Sacramento Capitals on the final day of the regular season, the Sportimes and Capitals closed the WTT regular season in a match with myriad implications. A Capitals victory would give them the number 4 seed in the WTT playoffs, clinch a playoff berth for the Lobsters, eliminate the Freedoms and give the Buzz the Eastern Conference championship and the number 2 seed. A Sportimes win would give them the Eastern Conference title and the number 2 seed, clinch a playoff berth for the Freedoms, eliminate the Lobsters, drop the Buzz to the number 3 seed and drop the Capitals to the number 5 seed. Witten opened the match with a 5–3 set win in men's singles. The Capitals won the next two sets to take a 13–10 lead. Sequera continued to be reliable for the Sportimes and won the fourth set of women's singles, 5–2, to tie the match at 15 all. The final set of men's doubles came down to a tiebreaker, and Sam Warburg and Eric Butorac squeezed out the victory over Wilson and Witten to give the Capitals a 20–19 triumph. Thus, the Sportimes' chances of winning the Eastern Conference title vanished on what was literally the final point played of the WTT regular season, after they had spent virtually the entire season as frontrunners.

Battle for New York in WTT Semifinals
The Sportimes were the overall number 3 seed which matched them with the number 2 seed, the New York Buzz, in the WTT Semifinals on July 26, at Allstate Stadium at Westfield Galleria at Roseville in Roseville, California, the site of WTT's 2008 Championship Weekend. Just hours before the match, WTT announced that Milagros Sequera had been injured and would be unavailable for the postseason. In her place, the Sportimes re-signed Ashley Harkleroad.

In the first ever postseason meeting between the two New York clubs, the Buzz dominated the match winning the first four sets. Nathan Healey and Yaroslava Shvedova opened the match with a 5–3 set win against John McEnroe and Hana Šromová in mixed doubles. Shvedova followed with a 5–2 women's singles win over Harkleroad. Healy took care of Jesse Witten, 5–2, in men's singles. Gabriela Navrátilová and Shvedova needed a tiebreaker to beat Harkleroad and Šromová, 5–4, and give the Buzz a 20–11 lead heading to the final set. McEnroe and Witten won a tiebreaker over Patrick Briaud and Healy in men's doubles to force overtime with the Buzz leading 24–16. Briaud and Healy won the second game of overtime to give the Buzz a 25–17 victory and end the Sportimes' season.

Event chronology
 March 19, 2008: The Sportimes protected John McEnroe at the WTT Marquee Player Draft.
 April 1, 2008: The Sportimes protected Jesse Witten and Hana Šromová and selected Bethanie Mattek and Brian Wilson at the WTT Roster Player Draft. The Sportimes left Ashley Harkleroad and Mirko Pehar unprotected.
 July 2, 2008: The Sportimes signed Tetiana Luzhanska as a substitute player.
 July 13, 2008: The Sportimes signed Robin Stephenson, who had appeared against them earlier in the season for the Philadelphia Freedoms and been released, as a substitute player.
 July 14, 2008: The Sportimes signed Milagros Sequera as a substitute player.
 July 19, 2008: With a record of 9 wins and 2 losses, the Sportimes clinched playoff berth and a bye to the WTT Semifinals, when the Kansas City Explorers defeated the Washington Kastles, 24–13.
 July 14, 2008: The Sportimes re-signed Ashley Harkleroad as a substitute player.
 July 26, 2008: The Sportimes lost to the New York Buzz, 25–17 in overtime, in the WTT Semifinals.

Draft picks
With 6 wins and 8 losses, the Sportimes had the fifth worst record in WTT in 2007. Since the Houston Wranglers folded after the 2007 season, the Sportimes selected fourth in each round of the WTT's two drafts.

Marquee player draft
The Sportimes protected John McEnroe in the first round of the WTT Marquee Player Draft and did not make a second-round selection.

Roster player draft
The league conducted its 2008 Roster Player Draft on April 1, in Miami, Florida. The selections made by  the Sportimes are shown in the table below.

The Sportimes did not select any roster-exempt players.

Match log

Regular season
{| align="center" border="1" cellpadding="2" cellspacing="1" style="border:1px solid #aaa"
|-
! colspan="2" style="background:#ED1C24; color:black" | Legend
|-
! bgcolor="ccffcc" | Sportimes Win
! bgcolor="ffbbbb" | Sportimes Loss
|-
! colspan="2" | Home team in CAPS
|}

Playoffs
{| align="center" border="1" cellpadding="2" cellspacing="1" style="border:1px solid #aaa"
|-
! colspan="2" style="background:#ED1C24; color:black" | Legend
|-
! bgcolor="ccffcc" | Sportimes Win
! bgcolor="ffbbbb" | Sportimes Loss
|-
! colspan="2" | Home team in CAPS
|}
World TeamTennis Semifinals

Team personnel

Players and coaches
 Dustin Taylor, Coach
 Ashley Harkleroad
 Tetiana Luzhanska
 Bethanie Mattek
 John McEnroe
 Milagros Sequera
 Hana Šromová
 Robin Stephenson
 Brian Wilson
 Jesse Witten

Front office
 Claude Okin, President
 Ann Marie Gaudio, General Manager

Notes:

Statistics
Players are listed in order of their game-winning percentage provided they played in at least 40% of the Sportimes' games in that event, which is the WTT minimum for qualification for league leaders in individual statistical categories.
Men's singles - regular season

Women's singles - regular season

Men's doubles - regular season

Women's doubles - regular season

Mixed doubles - regular season

Team totals - regular season

Men's singles - playoffs

Women's singles - playoffs

Men's doubles - playoffs

Women's doubles - playoffs

Mixed doubles - playoffs

Team totals - playoffs

Men's singles - all matches

Women's singles - all matches

Men's doubles - all matches

Women's doubles - all matches

Mixed doubles - all matches

Team totals - all matches

Transactions
 March 19, 2008: The Sportimes protected John McEnroe at the WTT Marquee Player Draft.
 April 1, 2008: The Sportimes protected Jesse Witten and Hana Šromová and selected Bethanie Mattek and Brian Wilson at the WTT Roster Player Draft. The Sportimes left Ashley Harkleroad and Mirko Pehar unprotected.
 July 2, 2008: The Sportimes signed Tetiana Luzhanska as a substitute player.
 July 13, 2008: The Sportimes signed Robin Stephenson as a substitute player.
 July 14, 2008: The Sportimes signed Milagros Sequera as a substitute player.
 July 14, 2008: The Sportimes re-signed Ashley Harkleroad as a substitute player.

See also

 Sports in New York

References

External links
World TeamTennis official website

San Diego Aviators seasons
New York Sportimes season
New York Sportimes 2008
New York Sportimes